The Campbell River First Nation (Wei Wai Kum) are the band government of one of the component groups of the Laich-kwil-tach or Southern Kwakiutl subgroup of the Kwakwaka'wakw peoples, based at the city of Campbell River.  They are part of the Hamatla Treaty Society.

Chief and Councillors

Chief Councillor - Christopher Roberts ; Councillors - Jim Henderson; Lorraine Henderson; Tony Roberts Jr;Shelly Haunch: Kim Puglas

Demographics
The Campbell River First Nation has 665 members.

References

Kwakwaka'wakw governments
Campbell River, British Columbia
Mid Vancouver Island